The Blind Woman of Sorrento (Italian: La cieca di Sorrento) is a 1953 Italian historical melodrama film directed by Giacomo Gentilomo and starring Antonella Lualdi, Paul Campbell and Enzo Biliotti. It was shot at the Cinecittà Studios in Rome. The film is based on the novel of the same title by Francesco Mastriani and is the third time that it has been filmed. It is set in the nineteenth century in Sorrento in southern Italy.

Plot 
In the 19th century, Naples was governed by the Bourbons. Doctor Pisani is a patriot who is unjustly accused of having killed a marquise. He does not want to betray the cause and allows himself to be executed. Ten years later, his son Oliviero, who has taken medical courses, restores the truth and wants to marry Béatrice, the Marquise's daughter, who became blind during the assault on her mother's castle by revolutionary patriots. Oliviero, having become an ophthalmologist, heals the girl and marries her.

Cast 
 Antonella Lualdi as Beatrice di Rionero  
 Paul Campbell as Oliviero Pisani 
 Enzo Biliotti as Ernesto Basileo, il notaio  
 Marilyn Buferd as Marchesina di Rionero  
 Charles Fawcett as Marchese di Rionero 
 Corrado Annicelli as Dottore Andrea Pisani  
 Vera Carmi as Elena Viscardi  
 Paul Muller as Carlo Basileo  
 Nuccia Aronne as Beatrice di Rionero, bambina 
 Michele Riccardini as Un congiurato  
 Giovanni Onorato as Altro congiurato 
 Maurizio Di Nardo as Oliviero, ragazzino  
 Giuliano Montaldo as Sacerdote 
 Sergio Bergonzelli
 Carlo d'Elia
 Giovanni Vari 
 Franco Marturano 
 Rina Dei
 Patrizia Lari  
 Gianni Luda 
 Vittorio Braschi 
 Annette Ciarli
 Carlo Hinterman 
 Anna Maini 
 Ina La Yana
 Raffaele Caporilli

References

External links 

1953 films
Italian historical drama films
1950s historical drama films
Films set in Sorrento
Films set in the 19th century
Films based on Italian novels
Films directed by Giacomo Gentilomo
Films scored by Carlo Rustichelli
1950s Italian-language films
Films about blind people
1953 drama films
Melodrama films
Italian black-and-white films
1950s Italian films
Films shot at Cinecittà Studios